McDonough syndrome, also known as Mental retardation, peculiar facies, kyphoscoliosis, diastasis recti, cryptorchidism, and congenital heart defect is a very rare multi-systemic genetic disorder which is characterized by facial dysmorphisms, psychomotor delays, intellectual disabilities, and congenital heart defects. Additional findings include either pectus excavatum or pectus carinatum, kyphoscoliosis, diastasis recti and cryptorchidism.

Signs and symptoms 

The following is a list of the symptoms individuals with this disorder usually exhibit:

 Superciliary arc prominence
 Unibrow (clinically known as synophrys)
 Strabismus
 Large ears with anteversion
 Large nose
 Teeth malocclusion
 Psychomotor delay
 Intellectual disabilities
 Pulmonic stenosis
 Patent ductus arteriosus
 Atrial septal defect

Less common symptoms include chest defects, kyphoscoliosis, diastasis recti ane cryptorchidism

Cases 

6 cases have been reported in medical literature:

 Gerhard Neuhäuser and John M. Opitz describes 3 out of 5 siblings from a 2-generation non-consanguineous family from Wisconsin with the symptoms mentioned above. These kids had IQs ranging from 47 to 67, which is considered clinical mental retardation. The youngest affected sibling had two X chromosomes and one Y chromosome and his father had te mosaic version of said disorder (46,XY/47,XXY). 1975
 Garcia-Sagredo et al. describes 2 out of 3 siblings  from a Spanish family. They had both the symptoms and the additional findings listed above in the article. One (male) of the children and his unaffected mother carried a balanced translocation on the 20th chromosome and the X chromosome. 1984
 Parul Jain, Ritu Arora, Abhilasha Sanoria, Akshay K Singh described 1 out of 3 siblings from a 2-generation family from New Delhi, India: an 11 year old boy with the symptoms mentioned above and blepharoptosis with low visual acuity. 2022

References 

Syndromes affecting the heart
Syndromes with intellectual disability
Syndromes with craniofacial abnormalities
Rare genetic syndromes